In Zoroastrianism, there are 101 names and titles used to refer to Ahura Mazda. The list is preserved in Persian, Pazend, and Gujarati.

The names are often taken during Baj (ceremonial prayer) as part of Yasna while continuously sprinkling with the ring made of eight metals with the hair of the pure Varasya named "Vars" into the water vessel.

List of names 

Two translations for each name are provided below, one by Meher Baba and the other from an online source.

See also
 Names of God
 Names of God in Christianity
 Names of God in Judaism
 Names of God in Islam
 Sahasranama

References 

Names of God in Zoroastrianism
Par